Baredi is a settlement in the Municipality of Izola in the Littoral region of Slovenia.

References

External links 
Baredi on Geopedia

Populated places in the Municipality of Izola